Lindford may refer to:

 Lindford, Hampshire, England
 Lindford, Minnesota, United States